Henry J.B. Meaden (born in 1862 in Point de Galle, Ceylon; date of death unknown) was an English first-class cricketer.

Meaden represented Hampshire in three first-class match in 1881, making his debut against Sussex. Meaden represented the county in two more games, against Sussex again and lastly the Marylebone Cricket Club.

External links
Henry Meaden at Cricinfo
Henry Meaden at CricketArchive

1862 births
English cricketers
Hampshire cricketers
Year of death missing
Sportspeople from Galle
English people of Sri Lankan descent